is a Japanese professional baseball player. He plays infielder for the Yomiuri Giants.

Professional career

Tokyo Yakult Swallows
On October 22, 2015, Hirooka was drafted by the Tokyo Yakult Swallows in the 2015 Nippon Professional Baseball draft.

On September 29, 2016, Hirooka debuted in the Central League against the Yokohama DeNA BayStars, and recorded his first Home run.

In 2016 - 2020 season, he recorded in 236 games with a batting average of .214, a 21 home runs, a RBI of 54.

Yomiuri Giants
On March 1, 2021, Hirooka was traded to the Yomiuri Giants.

References

External links

 NPB.jp

1997 births
Living people
Japanese baseball players
Nippon Professional Baseball shortstops
Nippon Professional Baseball third basemen
Baseball people from Osaka
Tokyo Yakult Swallows players
Yomiuri Giants players